All Change is the debut album by the English band Cast, released on 16 October 1995 by Polydor. It spawned four singles: "Finetime", "Alright", "Sandstorm" and "Walkaway". It became the highest selling debut album in the history of the Polydor label. A deluxe edition was released in November 2010.

Critical reception

Roch Parisien of AllMusic found the album to be "the perfect antidote to the inner rage fueling much American alternative rock", praising the production and Power's musicianship for carrying anthemic positivity and exuberant delivery, saying that "Cast transcends the hackneyed expectations of its environment, structure, and genetics through sheer, relentless quality of songcraft and performance."

In a retrospective review, Jamie Atkins of Record Collector said the album "still has the most to offer", highlighting "Alright", "Sandstorm" and "Finetime"; though on tracks such as "Tell It Like It Is" and "Walkaway" "we get strong hints of future disappointments".

Track listing

2010 Deluxe Edition
CD1
 "Alright"
 "Promised Land"
 "Sandstorm"
 "Mankind"
 "Tell It Like It Is"
 "Four Walls"
 "Finetime"
 "Back of My Mind"
 "Walkaway"
 "Reflections"
 "History"
 "Two of a Kind"
 "Instrumental (Original hidden track)"
 "Flying"
 "Better Man"
 "Satellites"
 "Follow Me Down"
 "Meet Me"
 "Hourglass"
 "Mother"
 "For So Long"

CD2
 "Sandstorm" (Demo)
 "Who You Gonna Ask?" (Demo)
 "Two Of A Kind" (Demo)
 "Finetime" (Demo)
 "Alright" (Demo)
 "Follow Me Down" (Demo)
 "Tell It Like it Is" (Demo)
 "History" (Demo)
 "Alright" (Demo)
 "Flying" (Demo)
 "Back Of My Mind" (Alternate Mix)
 "All My Days" (Outtake)
 "Back Of My Mind" (Live)
 "Sandstorm" (Live)
 "Reflections" (Live)
 "Walk Away" (Live)
 "Finetime" (Live)
 "Alright" (Live)

Personnel
Adapted from the liner notes of All Change.

Cast
 John Power – vocals, guitar
 Peter Wilkinson – backing vocals, bass
 Liam "Skin" Tyson – guitar
 Keith O'Neill – drums

Production
 John Leckie – producer, engineer, mixing
 Ash Alexander – assistant recording engineer (The Manor)

Additional musicians
 Jonathan Stone – strings (on "Walkaway")
 Vincent Needham – strings (on "Walkaway")

Artwork
 Norman Watson – photography
 Stylorouge – design

Chart performance

Certifications

References

External links
 [ All Change at Billboard]

1995 debut albums
Cast (band) albums
Polydor Records albums
Albums produced by John Leckie